Khursid Giyosov (born 13 April 1995) is an Uzbekistani footballer who currently plays for FC Bunyodkor.

Career

Club
On 5 February 2020, Giyosov signed for K League 2 club FC Anyang.

Career statistics

Club

International

Statistics accurate as of match played 9 November 2019

References

External links 
 

1995 births
Living people
Uzbekistani footballers
Uzbekistani expatriate footballers
Place of birth missing (living people)
Association football midfielders
Uzbekistan international footballers
FC Obod players
FC Anyang players
K League 2 players
FC Bunyodkor players
Uzbekistan Super League players
Uzbekistani expatriate sportspeople in South Korea
Expatriate footballers in South Korea